Major General Marion Eugene Carl (November 1, 1915 – June 28, 1998) was an American military officer, World War II fighter ace, record-setting test pilot, and naval aviator. He was the United States Marine Corps' first ace in World War II.

Early years
Born on the family dairy farm near Hubbard, Oregon, Carl was always attracted to aviation. He learned to fly while attending college and soloed after only 2½ hours of instruction; eight to ten hours is typical. He studied aeronautical engineering at Oregon State College (now a university) and, in 1938, graduated with a Bachelor of Science degree as a lieutenant in the Army Reserve.

Marine Corps career
Carl resigned his Army commission to become a naval aviation cadet and received his "Wings of Gold" and Marine Corps commission in December 1939. His first posting was to Marine Fighting Squadron One (VMF-1) at Quantico, Virginia. After a year there, he was posted back to Pensacola as an instructor pilot helping to train the rapidly growing number of naval aviators, before receiving orders to the newly formed Marine Fighting Squadron 221 (VMF-221) at NAS North Island in San Diego, California.

World War II
The 7 December 1941 attack on Pearl Harbor found VMF-221 preparing to embark aboard the aircraft carrier  for transport to Marine Corps Air Station Ewa on the island of Oahu, Hawaii. The unit was rushed to Hawaii, then to Wake Island as part of the WI Relief Task Force, still aboard Saratoga. After the relief attempt was cancelled, VMF-221 was deployed to Midway Atoll on Christmas Day, 1941. Carl's first combat occurred six months later during the Battle of Midway on June 4, 1942, when 15 of the 25 aircraft VMF-221 put into the air that morning were destroyed. Nevertheless, Carl was credited with destroying one enemy aircraft, a Mitsubishi Zero. All the survivors of VMF-221 were returned to Hawaii shortly after the battle.

After a short rest, Carl was reassigned to Marine Fighting Squadron 223 (VMF-223), led by former VMF-221 pilot Captain (later Major) John L. Smith. On August 20, VMF-223 was deployed to Guadalcanal, the first fighter unit ashore with the Cactus Air Force. Over the next two months, Carl became the Marines' first ace, running his tally to 16.5 victories, during which time he had to bail out once from a badly-damaged airplane. It is believed that on August 26 Carl shot down the famous Japanese Navy Tainan Kōkūtai ace Junichi Sasai over Henderson Field. When the squadron left Guadalcanal in October, Carl was America's second-ranking ace behind Major Smith.

In 1943, then-Major Carl returned to the Pacific and led VMF-223 until the following summer. During combat in the Solomon Islands, he claimed two more enemy planes, finishing as the Corps' seventh-ranking ace with 18.5 victories.

Aerial victory credits

Test pilot
In 1945, Carl graduated in the first test pilot class at Naval Air Station Patuxent River, Maryland. As a Lieutenant Colonel, he conducted pioneering jet operations from aircraft carriers and later commanded VMF-122, the first Marine jet squadron.

In 1947, Carl was one of two pilots selected to fly the Douglas D-558/I Skystreak in record-setting speed attempts. When Air Force Captain Chuck Yeager broke the sound barrier in October, he also broke Carl's record.

At Patuxent River on April 1, 1952, Carl had a close brush with death. He was performing a series of check spins in the new Grumman AF-2S Guardian anti-submarine attack aircraft. The anti-spin parachute that had been fitted in earlier tests had been removed. The aircraft entered a flat spin with strong centrifugal forces. He tried to operate the ejection seat, but the face blind ripped away in his hands and the seat failed to fire. He then tried the wind-tunnel approved method of getting out on the inside of the spin, but was forced back due to airflow. He finally got out on the other side and felt his parachute open as he fell into the splash of the aircraft. The success of this proved bailing out on the inside of the spin to avoid being hit by the tail was an incorrect theory.

Between test pilot duties, Carl commanded other units including a reconnaissance squadron based on Taiwan. In 1954, he led missions over Mainland China, photographing Communist forces along the coast. After his death, an incorrect version of his reconnaissance missions appeared in several obituaries, stating that he had flown U-2 spy planes.

Vietnam War

Though still a colonel, Carl became Director of Marine Corps Aviation for five months in 1962. In 1964 he was promoted to brigadier general; in 1965, he took the 1st Marine Brigade to Danang, South Vietnam.  Despite his seniority, he repeatedly flew combat missions in helicopter gunships and jet fighters.

Carl received his second star as a major general in 1967, commanding the 2nd Marine Aircraft Wing at MCAS Cherry Point, North Carolina from 1968 to 1970. He subsequently served as Inspector General of the Marine Corps, until retiring in 1973. By then he had logged some 13,000 flying hours, more than twice as much as most contemporaries.

Murder
Carl returned to his native Oregon, where he and his wife Edna settled near Roseburg. Marion Carl's memoir, Pushing the Envelope, coauthored with his friend Barrett Tillman, was published in 1994. In 1998, at age 82, he was shot to death during a robbery, defending Edna from a home invader. Carl had entered his living room late one evening and had found an intruder pointing a shotgun at his wife and demanding money and car-keys. Carl lunged at the intruder who fired his weapon, the shot grazing Edna's head and leaving her injured. The attacker then turned the weapon on Carl, fatally shooting him and the former then fled, stealing cash and the couple's car. Carl was buried with full military honors at Arlington National Cemetery.

His murderer, 19-year-old Jesse Fanus, was apprehended one week later. In April 1999, he was convicted on two counts of aggravated murder (and 11 additional felony charges) and sentenced to death. In 2003, his conviction and death sentence were upheld by the Oregon Supreme Court. In December 2011, the sentence was overturned based on the prisoner's inadequate legal representation. Fanus was sentenced to life in prison without the possibility of parole on May 7, 2015.

Carl's widow Edna passed away in 2007. His two children were Bruce and Lyanne.

Awards and legacy
Carl's decorations include (having declined any personal medals for service in Vietnam):

First Navy Cross citation
Citation:
The President of the United States of America takes pleasure in presenting the Navy Cross to Captain Marion Eugene Carl (MCSN: 0-6053), United States Marine Corps, for extraordinary heroism and distinguished service in the line of his profession while serving Section Leader and a Pilot in Marine Fighting Squadron TWO HUNDRED TWENTY-ONE (VMF-221), Marine Air Group TWENTY-TWO (MAG-22), Naval Air Station, Midway, during operations of the U.S. Naval and Marine Forces against the invading Japanese Fleet during the Battle of Midway on 4 June 1942. Leading his section in a dauntless and aggressive attack against a vastly superior number of Japanese bomber and fighter planes, Captain Carl aided in the disruption of enemy plans and lessened the effectiveness of their attack. As a result of his daring tactics, he succeeded in destroying one OO Isento KI Navy Fighter. The courageous leadership and utter disregard for personal safety displayed by Captain Carl in this attack were in keeping with the highest traditions of the United States Naval Service.

Second Navy Cross citation
Citation:

The President of the United States of America takes pleasure in presenting a Gold Star in lieu of a Second Award of the Navy Cross to Captain Marion Eugene Carl (MCSN: 0-6053), United States Marine Corps, for extraordinary heroism and distinguished service in the line of his profession while serving as a Pilot in Marine Fighting Squadron TWO HUNDRED TWENTY-THREE (VMF-223), Marine Air Group TWENTY-THREE (MAG-23), FIRST Marine Aircraft Wing, in aerial combat against enemy Japanese forces in the Solomons Islands Area from 24 August 1942 to 9 September 1942. With utter disregard for his own personal safety, Captain Carl, during the period of sixteen days, shot down ten enemy aircraft unassisted, and with the help of another Marine Corps pilot, succeeded in shooting down the eleventh plane. His brilliant daring and conspicuous skill as an airman served as an inspiration to other pilots of his squadron and contributed greatly to the security of the positions of the United States Forces in the Solomon Islands. His courageous and loyal devotion to duty is in keeping with the highest traditions of the United States Naval Service.

In 1992 Carl was inducted into the Lancaster Aerospace Walk of Honor.
On July 21, 2001, Carl was enshrined at Dayton, Ohio, in the National Aviation Hall of Fame class of 2001, along with North American X-15 pilot Joe Engle, USAF ace Robin Olds, and Albert Ueltschi.

In 1984, 1986, 1989, and 1992, Carl was honored at the Air Command and Staff College's Gathering of Eagles at Maxwell Air Base, Montgomery Alabama. This program encourages the study of airpower history by emphasizing the contributions of air and space pioneers.
Roseburg Regional Airport, in Roseburg, Oregon, was named the Marion E. Carl Memorial Field in his honor.
MATSG-23 holds an annual "Mud Run" in honor of Carl at the Naval Air Station, Lemoore, California. The 5-mile run includes mud pits, climbing walls, and other military obstacles to challenge the runners. The 13th Annual Mud Run was held on June 6, 2006.
The airfield at Marine Corps Air Station Kaneohe Bay was named for Carl.

See also

United States Marine Corps Aviation

References

Sources

Major General Marion E. Carl, USMC , Who's Who in Marine Corps History, History Division, United States Marine Corps.

External links

Arlington National Cemetery

1915 births
1998 deaths
American aviation record holders
American test pilots
American World War II flying aces
United States Marine Corps personnel of the Vietnam War
United States Marine Corps personnel of World War II
Aviators from Oregon
Battle of Midway
Burials at Arlington National Cemetery
Deaths by firearm in Oregon
Flight altitude record holders
National Aviation Hall of Fame inductees
Oregon State University alumni
People from Hubbard, Oregon
People from Roseburg, Oregon
People murdered in Oregon
Recipients of the Air Medal
Recipients of the Navy Cross (United States)
Recipients of the Legion of Merit
Recipients of the Distinguished Flying Cross (United States)
Shot-down aviators
United States Marine Corps generals
United States Marine Corps pilots of World War II
United States Naval Aviators
Military personnel from Oregon